Lionel Leonard Cohen, Baron Cohen, PC (1 March 1888 – 9 May 1973), was a British barrister and judge.

Early life and career 
Cohen was born in London, the only child of Sir Leonard Lionel Cohen, KCVO, a banker, and of Eliza Henrietta Cohen, née Schloss. His paternal grandfather was the financier and MP Lionel Louis Cohen. He was educated at Eton and New College, Oxford, where he took Firsts in History and Law. He was called to the bar in 1913 by the Inner Temple, but later joined Lincoln's Inn. During World War I, he served with the 1/13th London Regiment (1st Kensingtons Battalion), London Regiment, and was wounded in France.

After the war, Cohen returned to the bar, mainly practicing company law. He was made a King's Counsel in 1929. During World War II, Cohen served with the Ministry of Economic Warfare from 1939 to 1943.

Judicial career
Cohen was appointed to the High Court in 1943 and assigned to the Chancery Division, receiving the customary knighthood. In 1946, he was made a Lord Justice of Appeal and invested to the Privy Council. On 12 November 1951, he was appointed Lord of Appeal in Ordinary and made additionally a life peer with the title Baron Cohen, of Walmer in the County of Kent. In 1960, he retired as Lord of Appeal.

Cohen chaired many Royal Commissions in the years following World War II, particularly the Report of the Committee on Company Law Amendment in 1945 and on compensation. From 1946 to 1956 he chaired the Royal Commission on Awards to Inventors, which acknowledged scientists who had made technological advances such as radar and the jet engine during the war. He also headed the Cohen Inquiry into the loss of de Havilland Comet airliners Yoke Peter and Yoke Yoke in 1954.

Personal life
In 1918 Cohen married Adelaide Spielmann (1895-1961), daughter of Sir Isidore Spielmann; they had two sons and one daughter.  His son, Leonard Harold Lionel Cohen OBE practiced as a High Court judge.  Leonard's son, Sir Jonathan Cohen, was also a High Court judge.

Cases
Canada (Attorney General) v Hallet & Carey Ltd [1952] AC 427 (JCPC)
Candler v Crane, Christmas & Co [1951] 2 KB 164
Boardman v Phipps [1966] UKHL 2

Arms

See also
UK company law
Report of the Committee on Company Law Amendment (1945)

References

External links

1888 births
1973 deaths
Military personnel from London
British Army personnel of World War I
British Jews
People educated at Eton College
Alumni of New College, Oxford
Law lords 
Members of the Privy Council of the United Kingdom
Members of the Judicial Committee of the Privy Council
Chancery Division judges
Knights Bachelor
Lords Justices of Appeal
English King's Counsel
20th-century King's Counsel
London Regiment officers
Members of the Inner Temple
Members of Lincoln's Inn
Jewish British politicians
20th-century English lawyers
Life peers created by George VI